Liu Shibo (born 20 May 1997) is a Chinese footballer who plays as a goalkeeper for Guangzhou.

Club career
Liu Shibo was promoted to the Guangzhou Evergrande senior team in the 2017 league season and then loaned out to second tier club Nei Mongol Zhongyou where he made his debut in a league game on 22 July 2017 against Yunnan Lijiang in a 1-1 draw. Upon his return to Guangzhou he would eventually make his debut for the club on 29 May 2019 in a Chinese FA Cup game against Beijing Renhe where he came on as a substitute for Liu Dianzuo in a 5-0 victory.

Career statistics

Honours

Club
Guangzhou Evergrande
Chinese Super League: 2019

References

External links
 

1997 births
Living people
Chinese footballers
Association football goalkeepers
Inner Mongolia Zhongyou F.C. players
Guangzhou F.C. players
Chinese Super League players
China League One players
21st-century Chinese people